The 2020–21 SK Sturm Graz season was the club's 112th season in existence and the 55th consecutive season in the top flight of Austrian football. In addition to the domestic league, Sturm Graz participated in this season's edition of the Austrian Cup. The season covered the period from 6 July 2020 to 30 June 2021.

Players

First-team squad

Out on loan

Pre-season and friendlies

Competitions

Overview

Austrian Bundesliga

Regular stage

Results summary

Results by round

Matches
The league fixtures were announced on 9 July 2020.

Championship round

Results summary

Results by round

Matches

Austrian Cup

References

External links

SK Sturm Graz seasons
SK Sturm Graz